Groton is a city in southeastern Brown County, South Dakota, United States. The population was 1,380 at the 2020 census.

History
Groton was platted in 1881. The city was named after Groton, Massachusetts. A post office has been in operation at Groton since 1881.

Geography
Groton is located at  (45.451015, -98.099050).

Groton has been assigned the ZIP code 57445 and the FIPS place code 26340.

Demographics

2010 census
As of the census of 2010, there were 1,458 people, 576 households, and 373 families living in the city. The racial makeup of the city was 97.5% White, 0.3% African American, 0.5% Native American, 0.1% Asian, 0.2% from other races, and 1.4% from two or more races. Hispanic or Latino of any race were 0.9% of the population.

There were 576 households, of which 34.4% had children under the age of 18 living with them, 56.1% were married couples living together, 6.4% had a female householder with no husband present, 2.3% had a male householder with no wife present, and 35.2% were non-families. 30.4% of all households were made up of individuals, and 15.4% had someone living alone who was 65 years of age or older. The average household size was 2.45 and the average family size was 3.13.

The median age in the city was 40 years. 28.5% of residents were under the age of 18; 5.5% were between the ages of 18 and 24; 22.9% were from 25 to 44; 23.7% were from 45 to 64; and 19.4% were 65 years of age or older. The gender makeup of the city was 49.3% male and 50.7% female.

2000 census
As of the census of 2000, there were 1,356 people, 524 households, and 372 families living in the city. The population density was 796.5 people per square mile (308.0/km2). There were 581 housing units at an average density of 341.3 per square mile (132.0/km2). The racial makeup of the city was 99.04% White, 0.52% Native American, 0.07% from other races, and 0.37% from two or more races. Hispanic or Latino of any race were 0.44% of the population.

There were 524 households, out of which 35.7% had children under the age of 18 living with them, 59.7% were married couples living together, 8.8% had a female householder with no husband present, and 29.0% were non-families. 27.5% of all households were made up of individuals, and 14.7% had someone living alone who was 65 years of age or older. The average household size was 2.45 and the average family size was 2.99.

In the city, the population was spread out, with 27.8% under the age of 18, 5.7% from 18 to 24, 24.3% from 25 to 44, 20.2% from 45 to 64, and 22.0% who were 65 years of age or older. The median age was 39 years. For every 100 females, there were 88.3 males. For every 100 females age 18 and over, there were 83.0 males.

As of 2000 the median income for a household in the city was $38,125, and the median income for a family was $47,788. Males had a median income of $30,865 versus $21,688 for females. The per capita income for the city was $17,248. About 4.2% of families and 5.8% of the population were below the poverty line, including 5.5% of those under age 18 and 5.0% of those age 65 or over.

Notable people
 Robert A. Johnson, farmer, businessman, and South Dakota State Senator, lived in Groton.
 Earl Sande, Hall of Fame jockey and trainer, was born in Groton.

See also
 List of cities in South Dakota

References

External links

 

Cities in Brown County, South Dakota
Cities in South Dakota
Aberdeen, South Dakota micropolitan area
Populated places established in 1888
1888 establishments in Dakota Territory